The third electoral unit of Republika Srpska is a parliamentary constituency used to elect members to the House of Representatives of Bosnia and Herzegovina since 2000.

Demographics

Representatives

Election results

2022 election

2018 election

2010 election

2006 election

2002 election

2000 election

References 

Constituencies of Bosnia and Herzegovina